USS Cavalla (SSN-684), a , was the second ship of the United States Navy to be named for the cavalla, a salt water fish. Although it was a Sturgeon class design, Cavalla was a modified "long hull" boat, approximately  longer than the earlier ships in its class.

Construction and commissioning 
The contract to build Cavalla was awarded to the Electric Boat Division of General Dynamics Corporation in Groton, Connecticut, on 24 July 1968 and her keel was laid down there on 4 June 1970.  She was launched on 19 February 1972 sponsored by Mrs. Melvin Price, and commissioned on 9 February 1973, with Commander (later Admiral) Bruce DeMars in command.

Service history 

Cavalla operated as part of Submarine Squadron Ten from January 1974 to March 1975, then with Submarine Development Squadron 12 at Submarine Base New London (Groton, CT) until 1978.

In October 1978, Cavalla arrived as part of the Pacific Submarine force, and in November 1978 entered the Puget Sound Naval Shipyard for a refit lasting until March 1980, when she moved to her new home port at Submarine Base Pearl Harbor at Pearl Harbor, Hawaii, where she was assigned to Submarine Squadron 1. Her operations from Pearl Harbor covered the globe, including the Atlantic, Pacific, Indian, and Arctic Oceans.

During her 1981 Westpac cruise ( January–June ) under Commander Fredric W. Rohm USN, Cavalla visited HMAS Stirling in Rockingham, Western Australia, for R&R from 15 to 22 April 1981.

In 1983, Cavalla became the first submarine to successfully perform dry deck shelter—a tank attached to the after deck back of the submarine allowing personnel to leave the submarine while submerged—operations in 1983.

During her Western Pacific deployment of 1985–1986, Cavalla supported critical dry deck shelter operations for SEAL team certification. She was awarded the Meritorious Unit Commendation for these operations. In addition to this award, her crew members also earned various U.S. Navy ceremonial certificates during this same deployment: "shellback" status for crossing the equator, the Order of the Ditch on two occasions for transiting the Panama Canal, the Domain of the Golden Dragon on two occasions for crossing the International Date Line, and the Order of the Spanish Main for operating in the Caribbean Sea.

In 1992, 'Cavalla' deployed on an Eastern Pacific (EastPac) where they picked up target torpedoes in Bremerton and shot targets in the Aleutian Archipelago of the last frontier. A glorious port visit to San Francisco and Victoria British Columbia. While in Victoria a Canadian sailor got his hand caught between the Ballard and the mooring line which crushed his hand.

Later in 1992, 'Cavalla' deployed on yet another EastPac patrol. This time to the warm waters of the Caribbean. With the cold war winding down they found a new mission working hand in hand with the US Coast Guard. During this patrol they apprehended two high level assets from a local Panamanian cartel.

In 1993, 'Cavalla' deployed on a Western Pacific tour first stopping in Okinawa to pick up a three-star Marine Corps General (3rd MEF) to give him submarine diving and driving lessons by the lead helm. He commented on "the beads on our seats were like a taxicab in New York." Soon after we Okinawa, we crossed the International Dateline and the equator where all of the ship's crew became Golden Shellbacks and went through a particularly brutal ceremony. While eating the cherry out of King Neptunes belly button some weaker pollywogs got a special surprise from behind. When arriving in the Coral Sea we played war games 'sunk' the Australian carrier! The Cavalla was told no need to come shore for a liberty call. So, we continued the games with British submarines. Then to Guam where the Cavalla had minor upkeeps for two months during the summer. When many of the crew was at the local base club "Andy's Hut", there was an earthquake of the magnitude of 8.2. https://en.wikipedia.org/wiki/1993_Guam_earthquake . That quake split the pier in Apra Harbor where the Cavalla was moored. There was a watch set with an axe to cut the lines is the pier cracked to keep the Cavalla from rolling over and spill the acid in its battery bank. After being underwater for 56 days we got our first and only liberty port call of WestPac in Viti Levu of Fiji. For four Glorius day we drank Fiji Bitter and chased women. The Kava on the pier warmed our hands and our hearts. We were the first US nuclear submarine to ever enter their port.

In late 1993, 'Cavalla' deployed to the Persian Gulf to conducting intelligence, surveillance, and reconnaissance (ISR) operations. Frequent surfacing with snorkeling sending transmission at periscope depth. Exposing the crew to burn pits and other gulf war toxins.

In 1995, 'Cavalla deployed to the Arctic Ocean for civilian scientific research.

In 1996, Cavalla participated in the very first joint American-Japanese Deep Submergence Rescue Vehicle deep submergence rescue vehicle operation.

 Decommissioning and disposal Cavalla'' was decommissioned on 30 March 1998 and stricken from the Naval Vessel Register the same day. Her scrapping via the Nuclear-Powered Ship and Submarine Recycling Program at Puget Sound Naval Shipyard in Bremerton, Washington, was completed on 17 November 2000.

References

External links 

NavSource Online: Submarine Photo Archive Cavalla (SSN-684)

 

Ships built in Groton, Connecticut
Sturgeon-class submarines
Cold War submarines of the United States
Nuclear submarines of the United States Navy
1972 ships